Longwood Central School District covers  in central Brookhaven Town, Suffolk County, New York, United States.  It serves the hamlets of Ridge, Gordon Heights, Middle Island, Coram, and Yaphank, and parts of Shoreham, Shirley, Medford, and Upton (Brookhaven National Laboratory). During the 2017–2018 school year, there were 15,833 students enrolled and 2,069 teachers employed at Longwood CSD.

Lance Lohman, Ed.D., is the current Superintendent of Schools.

History

Longwood Central School District was formed from a merger of the Coram, Yaphank, West Yaphank, East Middle Island, West Middle Island, and Ridge school districts in 1959.  It was originally called the "Middle Island Central School District" before the Longwood name was adopted in the 1980s.

Schools
There are four primary schools in Longwood CSD, each serving grades 2, 3, and 4 in the main building and kindergarten through first in an annex:
Ridge Elementary School
Charles E. Walters Elementary School in Yaphank
West Middle Island Elementary School in Middle Island
Coram Elementary School

There are three secondary schools in Longwood CSD:
Longwood Middle School (approx. 2,000 students), part of the "open school project" in the 1970s, serves grades 5-6.
Longwood Junior High School (approx. 2,000 students) serves grades 7-8.
Longwood High School (approx. 3,000 students) serves grades 9-12.

The land on which the High School (now the JHS) was built was donated by Elbert Smith from the Longwood Estate.

Renovations
During the 1999–2000 school year, fences went up surrounding each school property. Construction adding four new wings in the high school, two new wings in the junior high school, one new "house" in the middle school, and complete renovation of the primary buildings and various additions to the intermediate buildings of the elementary schools was underway. The new wings of the high, junior high, and middle schools and the intermediate buildings of the elementary schools were complete and ready for the 2000–2001 school year. During the 2000–2001 school year, construction crews demolished all but one hallway in each primary building of the elementary schools. Major additions were completed while school was in session. The hallways that were left ended up being gutted during the summer of 2001, and they were fully restored for the 2001–2002 school year.

Grade shifting
For the 2001–2002 school year, when most of the renovations were complete, the grades housed in each school building changed. The elementary schools went from housing grades K-5 to housing grades K-4; the middle school from grades 6-7 to grades 5-6; the junior high school from grades 8-9 to grades 7-8; and the high school from grades 10-12 to grades 9-12. Because of this change, from 2000 until 2005, the first day of classes was different for every grade. Grades K-2, 5, 7, 9, and 10 began classes on one day, while grades 3-4, 6, 8, and 11-12 began classes the following day. Both sets of grades then attended classes on the third day and would continue to follow normal schedules from that point on.

Academics
According to 2007 data, 82% of Longwood graduates earn a New York State Regent's diploma.  44.9 percent of graduates plan to attend 4 year college, and 40.7% plan to attend a 2-year college.  In 2005, 86% of the class went on to college, with 8% going on to serve in the military or directly into the workforce, and 78% earned a Regents Diploma.

Athletics
Longwood schools feature football, cheerleading, track, baseball, wrestling, basketball, volleyball, softball, soccer, tennis, lacrosse, cross country and many other athletic opportunities.

The most recent notable athletic achievement for the Longwood school district is the National Championship Cheerleading team of 2009-10. On October 11, 2014, the Longwood High School Varsity Football Team was ranked the #1 team on Long Island after making their 5th win with no losses for the homecoming game. They went on to win Suffolk Division I as undefeated 8-0 champions before losing to Patchogue-Medford High School in the second round of the playoffs with a 9-1 record. The next season, the 2015 season, the Football Team came back much stronger to become Class I Long Island Champions with an 11-1 record. The only loss that season was to Lindenhurst during Week 5, which they crushed 44-14 in the Class I Suffolk County Championships.

Notable alumni
 Biz Markie (1964–2021), American rapper, singer, DJ, record producer, actor, comedian, and writer
 Jamel Herring (born 1985), Olympian and professional boxer
 Kerry McCoy (born 1974), United States Olympian wrestler
 Bryant Neal Vinas (born 1982), convicted Al Qaeda supporter
 Tony Nese (born 1985), professional wrestler
 Odyssey Jones (born 1994), professional wrestler
 Cletus Seldin (born 1986), boxer
 Tika Sumpter (born 1980), actress
 Phallon Tullis-Joyce (born 1996), professional soccer player

References

External links
 Longwood CSD Official website - includes a history of the district.
  - honoring cheerleading team
[ https://govtjobresults.com/2023/01/31/longwood-public-schools-jobs-2023/] Longwood Public Schools District Jobs

Education in Suffolk County, New York
School districts in New York (state)
Schools in Suffolk County, New York
Buildings and structures in Suffolk County, New York
School districts established in 1959